Khovansky is a rural locality (a khutor) in Buyerak-Popovskoye Rural Settlement, Serafimovichsky District, Volgograd Oblast, Russia. The population was 169 as of 2010. There are 4 streets.

Geography 
Khovansky is located near the Don River, 20 km west of Serafimovich (the district's administrative centre) by road. Buyerak-Senyutkin is the nearest rural locality.

References 

Rural localities in Serafimovichsky District